Human touch may refer to:

Touch, one of the sensations processed by the human somatosensory system
Touching or physical intimacy
Haptic communication, the study of touching behaviour
Human Touch (film), a 2004 film directed by Paul Cox

Music
Human Touch, a 1992 album by Bruce Springsteen
"Human Touch" (Betty Who song)
"Human Touch" (Bruce Springsteen song)
"Human Touch" (Rick Springfield song)
"Human Touch", a song by Elvis Costello from the album Get Happy!!
"Human Touch", a song by Warren Wiebe, an ending theme of After War Gundam X
"Human Touch", a song by Hue and Cry from the album Seduced and Abandoned